Manan may refer to:

People with the name 
Manan Ahmed Asif (born 1971), Pakistani-American historian
Manan Chandra (born 1981), Indian snooker and pool player
Manan Desai (born 1987), Indian actor and comedian
Manan Hingrajia (born 1998), Indian cricketer
M. A. Manan (1930s–2009), Bangladesh politician
Anuar Manan (born 1986), Malaysian cyclist
Bagir Manan (born 1941), Indonesian jurist
K. K. Manan (fl. 2000s–2010s), Indian jurist
Mian Abdul Manan, Pakistani politician
Manan Sharma (born 1991), Indian cricketer who plays for Delhi cricket team in domestic cricket
Suryatati Abdul Manan (born 1953), Malay politician
Manan Trivedi (born 1974), American physician and politician
Manan Vohra (born 1993), Indian cricketer

Places 
 Mānān, a 10th-century town in the Kanem–Bornu Empire in central Africa
 Manan-gu, a district (gu) of Anyang, South Korea
 Manan, Kapurthala, a village in Punjab, India

Other uses 
 Manan (reflection), or manana, in Indian philosophy
 Manan, a fictional character in the novel The Tombs of Atuan

See also 
 Kot Manan, a village in Punjab, Pakistan
 Grand Manan, an island of Canada
 Mannan (disambiguation)
 Manon (disambiguation)
 Manen (disambiguation)